Polyschisis hirtipes is a species of beetle in the family Cerambycidae. It was described by Olivier in 1792.

References

Trachyderini
Beetles described in 1792